Jeon Hyun-hee (born 4 November 1964) is a South Korean dentist-turned lawyer and politician currently serving as the Chairperson of Anti-Corruption and Civil Rights Commission under President Moon Jae-in from June 2020 and previously served as a two-term parliamentarian.

After graduating from dentistry school she worked as a dentist. In 1996 she became the first dentist to ever pass the state bar exam. In the early 2000s she persuaded the people infected with AIDS from Haemophilia medicine and their families and began the pro bono lawsuit against the pharmaceutical companies. In 2011 the Supreme Court ruled in favour of victims.

In the 2008 general election, Jeon was placed as the number 7 on the proportional list for democratic party. For the 2012 general election, she applied to become the party's candidate for Seoul Gangnam B constituency. After losing party nomination for the constituency to Chung Dong-young, her party's candidate in the previous presidential election, she was given other constituency but rejected the offer. In 2016 she was the first to win party's nomination among the candidates for Seoul's constituencies. In the 2016 general election she defeated the incumbent Kim Jong-hoon becoming the first liberal parliamentarian to represent Gangnam District in two decades.

Jeon is best to known to the public through her work as the head of Carpool-Taxi TF of her party's Policy Planning Committee. After visiting representatives of taxi industry for over 200 times, she successfully mediated two sides to reach an agreement.

A month after losing her re-election in 2020, Jeon was appointed by President Moon as the chair of Anti-Corruption and Civil Rights Commission. She has called for proactive public administration in fulfilling its mandate of fighting against corruption and securing citizens' civil rights.

Jeon holds two degrees - a DDS from Seoul National University and a master's in law from Korea University.

Electoral history

References 

Living people
1964 births
21st-century South Korean politicians
Members of the National Assembly (South Korea)
South Korean dentists
Seoul National University alumni
Korea University alumni
People from Tongyeong
21st-century South Korean lawyers
South Korean women lawyers
Minjoo Party of Korea politicians
Women government ministers of South Korea
Female members of the National Assembly (South Korea)